Waiting for Woody is a 1998 drama short film directed by and starring Grant Heslov.

Plot

Cast
Grant Heslov as Josh Silver
Samantha Mathis as Gail Silver
Tate Donovan as David
Richard Kind as Doorman
Thom Mathews as Bike Messenger 
George Clooney as himself
Jennifer Aniston as herself
Ed Crasnick as Woody Allen
Carol Ann Susi 
Pamela Adlon

Accolades

Releases

Notes

External links
 

1998 films
1998 short films
American drama short films
1998 comedy-drama films
American comedy-drama films
Films with screenplays by Grant Heslov
Films directed by Grant Heslov
1990s English-language films
1990s American films